Villafranca (Billafranca in Basque) is a village in Álava, Basque Country, Spain.

Populated places in Álava